Terrell Grobes (born February 8, 1993) is an American basketball player who plays for Libertadores de Querétaro in the Mexican Liga Nacional de Baloncesto Profesional League. He played college basketball for Wilmington University.

Early life 
Grobes was born in Sharon Hill, Pennsylvania.

Professional career 
After going undrafted June 22, 2017 in the 2017 NBA Draft, Grobes signed with Pioneros de Los Mochis in the Mexican CibaCopa League.

On October 11th, 2018, Grobes signed with AND-1 La Paz of Libobasquet Bolivia.

On August 25th, 2019 Grobes signed with Cusco Bylys of the LNB Peru league.

On July 20th, 2020 Grobes signed with Libertadores de Queretaro of the Liga Nacional de Baloncesto Profesional League.

On July 11th, 2021 Grobes signed with Amistad Sucre of the Libobasquet league.

References

Basketball players from Pennsylvania
Libertadores de Querétaro players
Living people

1993 births